KRWB may refer to:

 KRWB-TV, a television station (channel 21) licensed to Roswell, New Mexico, United States, repeating KWBQ
 KRWB (AM), a radio station (1410 AM) licensed to Roseau, Minnesota, United States